Samantha Grace Coffey (born December 31, 1998) is an American professional soccer player who plays as a midfielder for Portland Thorns FC in the National Women's Soccer League and for the United States national team.

Early career

Youth
Coffey played youth club soccer for Match-Fit Academy and New York Soccer Club, where she was a five-time "region 1 team" honoree and named an all-American. In high school, she played for the Masters School, where she was selected as team MVP all four years and was a team captain for two seasons. She was named the league player of the year three times, and scored 100 goals in high school.

Boston College
Coffey began her college soccer career with the Boston College Eagles in 2017. She led the team in assists and points as a freshman, and was selected to the All-ACC third team and freshman team. She was her team's co-rookie of the year, and was the Boston College Freshman Scholar Athlete of the Year. As a sophomore in 2018, she helped the team reach the first round of the 2018 NCAA Division I Women's Soccer Tournament, their first appearance since 2015. She was the team leader in both goals and assists, and was a semi-finalist for the Hermann Trophy. She was a United Soccer Coaches first-team All-American, was included in the All-ACC first team, and was selected as the ACC midfielder of the year. In both years she was also included in the All-ACC Academic Team. During her two seasons at the school, she started all 40 games, scoring 17 goals and recording 24 assists.

Penn State
In December 2018, it was announced that Coffey would transfer to Pennsylvania State University to play for the Nittany Lions starting in the 2019 season. She enrolled in classes at the school in January 2019. In her junior season in 2019, she scored 11 goals and recorded 10 assists, ranking second in the Big Ten Conference with her 32 points. She helped the team to win the 2019 Big Ten Women's Soccer Tournament, in which she scored an equalizing penalty goal in the final against Michigan to send the game to extra time. The team advanced to the round of 16 of the 2019 NCAA Division I Women's Soccer Tournament before losing 2–0 to eventual champions Stanford. During her senior 2020–21 season, which was postponed to spring semester due to the COVID-19 pandemic, Coffey scored 6 goals and recorded 12 assists in 16 matches for the team as a captain. Penn State were eliminated in the round of 16 of the 2020 NCAA Division I Women's Soccer Tournament, losing to eventual runner-up Florida State. As the NCAA granted all student-athletes another year of eligibility due to the pandemic, Coffey played her fifth college season in 2021 as a graduate student. She recorded 8 goals and 8 assists in 21 games, with the team losing in the round of 16 of the 2021 NCAA Division I Women's Soccer Tournament to South Carolina.

In all three seasons, Coffey was included in the All-Big Ten and All-North Region first teams. She was included in the United Soccer Coaches Scholar All-America Second Team in 2019, and the CoSIDA Academic All-America First-Team in 2020–21. She was selected as the Big Ten Midfielder of the Year in 2020–21, and in the same season was included in the Senior CLASS Award First Team All-America. In 2019 and 2020, she was also included in the CoSIDA Academic All-District first team. Coffey made 62 appearances during her three seasons at Penn State, scoring 25 goals and recording 30 assists. She finished her collegiate career with 42 goals and 54 assists in 102 appearances, becoming the 50th player in NCAA Division I to tally 40 goals and 40 assists.

Club career

Portland Thorns FC
After the NCAA granted all student-athletes another year of eligibility due to the effects of the COVID-19 pandemic, Coffey decided not to enter herself into the 2021 NWSL Draft as she was uncertain about her future. Nevertheless, she was still entered into the draft, and was selected by Portland Thorns FC with the 12th overall pick in the second round. However, she ultimately decieded to play an additional year of college soccer with Penn State. On January 7, 2022, the Portland Thorns signed Coffey on a two-year contract. She made her debut for the team in the 2022 NWSL Challenge Cup on March 18, 2022, playing the full match in a 1–1 away draw against OL Reign. She made her NWSL regular season debut on April 30, 2022, playing the full match in a 3–0 home win over the Kansas City Current.

International career

Youth
Coffey was a member of the United States youth squads on the under-18, under-19, and under-20 levels. With the under-18 team, she attended six training camps and played in two international tournaments. At the under-20 level, she was included in the U.S. squad for the 2018 CONCACAF Women's U-20 Championship, held in Trinidad and Tobago. The team finished as runners-up after losing the final on penalties to Mexico. However, the team still qualified for the 2018 FIFA U-20 Women's World Cup in France, though Coffey was not selected as a squad member.

Senior
In June 2022, Coffey earned her first call-up to the United States women's national team for two friendlies against Colombia. Despite being uncapped, Coffey was later added as an injury replacement for Ashley Hatch after the group stage of the 2022 CONCACAF W Championship.

International summary

Personal life
Coffey was born in New York City to Wayne Coffey and Denise Willi. She grew up in Sleepy Hollow, New York, and attended the Masters School. She earned her bachelor's degree in journalism from Pennsylvania State University at the end of 2020, and began pursuing her graduate degree at the school afterwards.

Honors
Penn State Nittany Lions
Big Ten Women's Soccer Tournament: 2019

Portland Thorns FC

 NWSL Championship: 2022

United States U20
CONCACAF Women's U-20 Championship runner-up: 2018

United States
 CONCACAF Women's Championship: 2022

Individual
 NWSL Rookie of the Month: June 2022
 NWSL Best XI of the Month: June 2022
 NWSL Best XI: 2022

References

External links

 
 
 Sam Coffey at Timbers.com

1998 births
Living people
Soccer players from New York City
People from Sleepy Hollow, New York
Women's association football midfielders
American women's soccer players
United States women's under-20 international soccer players
United States women's international soccer players
Boston College Eagles women's soccer players
Penn State Nittany Lions women's soccer players
Portland Thorns FC players
National Women's Soccer League players